Fernando Remírez de Estenoz Barciela (born on 9 October 1951) is a Cuban politician and diplomat.

Remírez de Estenoz is a medical doctor who graduated from the University of Havana. He is married and has two children.

Remírez de Estenoz was Head of the Cuban Communist Party Foreign Relations Department from 2004 until March 2009.  He has been from 1992 First Vice Minister of Foreign Affairs.  Head of the Cuban Interests Section in Washington, D.C. from 1995 to 2001.  Cuban UN Ambassador from 1993 to 1994.

References

 The Miami Herald, Cuba: Another Leading Official Ousted, Friday, March 6, 2009, Page 6A.

1951 births
Living people
Ambassadors of Cuba to the United States
Communist Party of Cuba politicians
Permanent Representatives of Cuba to the United Nations